Shirvanzade may refer to:

Alexander Shirvanzade, pen name of Alexander Movsesyan (1858-1935), Armenian playwright and novelist
Xoylu, Shamakhi, village in Azerbaijan